The 1969 Peruvian Segunda División, the second division of Peruvian football (soccer), was played by 10 teams. The tournament winner, Deportivo SIMA was promoted to the 1970 Torneo Descentralizado.

Results

Standings

Relegation playoff

Peruvian Segunda División seasons
Peruana, 1969
1969 in Peruvian football